Elachista hedemanni is a moth of the family Elachistidae. It is found from Germany to Spain and Romania. It is also found in Ukraine and Russia.

The forewing ground colour is slightly glossy, creamy white, scattered with black scales and with three indistinct yellow longitudinal lines. The basal third of the costa is black. The hindwings are grey, with paler yellowish fringe scales.

The larvae feed on Carex humilis, Holcus mollis and Stipa pennata. They mine the leaves of their host plant. The mine starts at the base of the blade of a leaf of the previous year. They are dirty yellow with a honey-yellow head. Larvae can be found from July to April.

References

hedemanni
Moths described in 1899
Moths of Europe